Varneville-Bretteville is a commune in the Seine-Maritime department in the Normandy region in northern France.

Geography

Heraldry

Population

Places of interest
 The church of St. Vincent and St. Médard, dating from the thirteenth century.
 The nineteenth-century chateau of Bel-Event
 Remains of a Roman camp called  ‘Le Bouteillerie’.
 Vestiges of an ancient castle.
 Old manorhouses, a presbytery and a dovecote.

See also
Communes of the Seine-Maritime department

References

Communes of Seine-Maritime